A miniature is a small-scale reproduction, or a small version. It may refer to:

 Portrait miniature, a miniature portrait painting
 Miniature art, miniature painting, engraving and sculpture
 Miniature (chess), a short chess game, typically with no more than 25 moves.

 Miniature (illuminated manuscript), a small painting in an illuminated text
 Arabic miniature, a small painting in an illuminated text
 Armenian miniature, a small painting in an illuminated text
 Persian miniature, a small painting in an illuminated text or album
 Ottoman miniature, a small painting in an illuminated text or album
 Contemporary Turkish Miniature, painting
 Mughal miniature, a small painting in an illuminated text or album
 Scale model
 Room box
 Figurine
 Miniature figure (gaming), a small figurine used in role playing games and tabletop wargames
 Miniature (alcohol), a very small bottle of an alcoholic drink
 Miniature rose
 Miniature candy, smaller variations of candy bars and candy
 Miniature effect, a physical model of a larger object used to represent it in filmmaking
 Miniature horse, a very small breed of horse
 Miniature poodle, a smaller breed of poodle (dog)

Entertainment
 Miniatures (Alog album), 2005
 Miniatures (Nekropolis album), 1989
 Miniature (album), a 1988 album by Tim Berne
 "Miniature" (The Twilight Zone), a 1963 episode of The Twilight Zone